The Caninae, known as canines, are one of three subfamilies found within the canid family. The other two canid subfamilies are the extinct Borophaginae and Hesperocyoninae. The Caninae includes all living canids and their most recent fossil relatives. Their fossils were first found in North America and dated to the Oligocene era, then spreading to  Asia at the end of the Miocene era, some 7 million to 8 million years ago.

Taxonomy and lineage

The genus Leptocyon (Greek: leptos slender + cyon dog) includes 11 species and was the first primitive canine. They were small and weighed around 2 kg. They first appeared in Sioux County, Nebraska in the Orellan era 34-32 million years ago, which was the beginning of the Oligocene. This was the same time as the appearance of the Borophaginae with whom they share features, indicating that these were two sister groups. Borophaginae skull and dentition were designed for a powerful killing bite compared with the Leptocyon which were designed for snatching small, fast-moving prey. The species L. delicatus is the smallest canid to have existed. At the close of their genus 9 million years ago one Leptocyon lineage resembled the modern fox. The various species of Leptocyon branched 11.9 Mya into Vulpini (foxes) and Canini (canines).

The canines spent two-thirds of their history in North America, before dispersing 7 million years ago into Asia, Europe, and Africa. One of the characteristics that distinguished them from the Borophaginae and Hesperocyoninae was their possession of less weight in their limbs and more length in their legs, which may have aided their dispersion. The first canine to arrive in Eurasia was the coyote-sized Canis cipio, whose scant fossils were found in Spain. However, the assignment of C. cipio within the canines to the genus Canis or genus Eucyon is not clear.

Phylogenetic relationships 

The results of allozyme and chromosome analyses have previously suggested several phylogenetic divisions:

DNA analysis shows that the first three form monophyletic clades. The wolf-like canines and the South American canines together form the tribe Canini. Molecular data imply a North American origin of living Canidae some 10 Mya and an African origin of wolf-like canines (Canis, Cuon, and Lycaon), with the jackals being the most basal of this group.

The South American clade is rooted by the maned wolf and bush dog, and the fox-like canines by the fennec fox and Blanford's fox. The gray fox and island fox are basal to the other clades; however, this topological difference is not strongly supported.

The cladogram below is based on the phylogeny of Lindblad-Toh (2005) modified to incorporate recent findings on Canis, Vulpes, Lycalopex species, and Dusicyon.

References

External links

 
Extant Miocene first appearances